Prince Frederick of the Netherlands, Prince of Orange-Nassau (full names: Willem Frederik Karel; 28 February 1797, in Berlin – 8 September 1881, in Wassenaar), was the second son of William I of the Netherlands and his wife, Wilhelmine of Prussia.

Early life
The prince grew up at the court of his grandfather Frederick William II of Prussia and uncle Frederick William III of Prussia. One of his tutors was Carl von Clausewitz. Aged 16, the prince fought in the Battle of Leipzig.

The prince first entered the Netherlands in December 1813. As he spoke no Dutch, the prince was sent to Leiden University to get a further education. He was also educated by Karl Ludwig von Phull in The Hague. When Napoleon returned from Elba, during the Hundred Days the prince was given command of a detachment of Wellington's army which was posted in a fall back position near Braine-le-Comte should the battle taking place at Waterloo be lost.

Prince of the Netherlands
Based on a house treaty, Frederick was to inherit the family's German possessions upon his father's death. After the treaty of Vienna these were no longer in the possession of the family. He instead was made heir to the Grand Duchy of Luxemburg. In 1816, Frederick relinquished this claim in exchange for land in the Netherlands and the title of Prince of the Netherlands. As a further compensation he received a yearly amount of 190,000 Dutch guilders. This made him the wealthiest member of the House of Orange-Nassau. With the money he bought a large estate in Germany, which made him the largest land owner from the Netherlands.

In 1826 Frederick was appointed Commissary-general of the Department of War. In this office, Frederick reorganized the army on a Prussian model. Frederick founded the Royal military academy in Breda and reequipped the army with modern weapons.

When the Belgian Revolution broke out in 1830, Frederick commanded the troops sent to Brussels to suppress the rebellion there. Frederick led these troops in several days of fighting in Brussels, but could not retake the city. Frederick also took part in his brother's 1831 Ten Days' Campaign in Belgium.

When his father abdicated in 1840, Frederick withdrew from public life to his estates at Wassenaar. In 1846 he acquired Schloss Muskau in Prussia where he completed Muskau Park, the largest and one of the most famous English gardens in Central Europe, stretching along both sides of the present German–Polish border on the Lusatian Neisse. The park had been laid out from 1815 onwards at the behest of Prince Hermann von Pückler-Muskau (1785–1871). In July 2004, Muskau Park was added to the list of UNESCO World Heritage Sites.

Upon the death of his elder brother in 1849, the country was left with a large debt. Frederick managed to pay off a million guilder to Tsar Nicholas I of Russia, who was brother-in-law to William II. The new King William III of the Netherlands (Frederick's nephew) did not want to inherit the kingship from his father, but Frederick managed to convince him to take up the position, offering to assist him. William III recalled Frederick and made him Inspector-General of the army. Frederick held that office until 1868, when he resigned because of the lack of support for his plans to modernize the army. Frederick managed to prevent a divorce between King William III and Queen Sophie of Württemberg by establishing a legal separation. He retired to Muskau Castle which was remodeled in Renaissance revival style between 1863 and 1866.

Marriage
Prince Frederick married in Berlin on 21 May 1825 his first cousin Louise, daughter of Frederick William III of Prussia. They had four children:
 Wilhelmina Frederika Alexandrine Anna Louise (5 August 1828 in The Hague – 30 March 1871 in Stockholm), married in Stockholm on 19 June 1850 to Charles XV of Sweden (3 May 1826 in Stockholm – 18 September 1872 in Malmö)
 Willem Frederik Nicolaas Karel (6 July 1833 in The Hague – 1 November 1834 in The Hague)
 Willem Frederik Nicolaas Albert (22 August 1836 in The Hague – 23 January 1846 in The Hague)
 Wilhelmina Frederika Anna Elisabeth Maria Marie (5 July 1841 in Huize De Paauw, Wassenaar – 22 June 1910 in Neuwied), married in Wassenaar on 18 July 1871 to William, Prince of Wied (22 August 1845 in Neuwied – 22 October 1907 in Neuwied). They were parents of William, Prince of Albania.

Honours

Ancestry

References

1797 births
1881 deaths
Dutch members of the Dutch Reformed Church
Members of the Council of State (Netherlands)
Inspectors general
Military personnel from Berlin
House of Orange-Nassau
Royal Netherlands Navy admirals
Royal Netherlands Navy officers
Royal Netherlands Army generals
Royal Netherlands Army officers
Ministers of War of the Netherlands
People from the Margraviate of Brandenburg
Burials in the Royal Crypt at Nieuwe Kerk, Delft
Dutch Freemasons
Dutch military personnel of the Napoleonic Wars
Colonel generals of Prussia
William I of the Netherlands
People from Bad Muskau
Princes of Orange-Nassau
19th-century Prussian military personnel
19th-century Dutch military personnel
Knights Grand Cross of the Military Order of William
Grand Crosses of the Order of Saint Stephen of Hungary
Recipients of the Iron Cross (1813)
Recipients of the Iron Cross, 2nd class
Knights of the Order of Charles XIII
Recipients of the Order of St. George of the Fourth Degree
Sons of kings